This is a list of official overseas trips made by Kersti Kaljulaid, the 5th President of Estonia. On many of her overseas visits, she has been accompanied by Georgi-Rene Maksimovski, who is her husband and concurrently the First Gentleman of Estonia.

List of visits

References 

Kaljulaid
2016 in international relations
2017 in international relations
2018 in international relations
2019 in international relations
2020 in international relations
Kaljulaid
Kaljulaid